The Mashouda or Meshuda was the Algerian fleet flagship of admiral Raïs Hamidou during the Second Barbary War. Stephen Decatur captured her in June 1815 at the Battle off Cape Gata. This created a favorable American position from which to bargain with the Dey of Algiers. Lloyd's List reported that the Algerine frigate Mezoura, which had been under the command of the Algerine admiral, had arrived at Carthagena on 20 June 1815 as a prize to Decatur's squadron. The newspaper also reported that Decatur's squadron had run another Spanish frigate onshore near Carthagena.

The Spanish government interned Mashouda and returned her to Algiers at the end of the war. However, on 18 July 1815 the Algerines declared war on Spain so the Spanish government seized both her and the brig Estedio, which Decatur had also captured, at Cartagena.

See also
List of ships captured in the 19th century

References

Barbary Wars ships
Naval ships of Algeria
Algerian National Navy